Zlatko Vujović (born 26 August 1958) is a Croatian retired footballer who played as a striker.

His twin brother, Zoran, was also a professional footballer. They were both Yugoslav internationals, and both spent a large part of their professional careers in France.

Club career
Born in Sarajevo, Vujović started his professional career with Hajduk Split, making his first division debuts at just 18 and going on to score more than 100 goals in the league (172 overall in 420 matches), while often partnering his brother Zoran. He helped his first club win one league in 1979 and one cup five years later, also being named Yugoslav Footballer of the Year in 1981 by the Večernji list daily.

In 1986, both siblings moved to compete in France, first with FC Girondins de Bordeaux: in their first season both were undisputed starters in an eventual double, as Zlatko also scored in the 2–0 cup win against Olympique de Marseille.

Vujović continued to net with at excellent rate until he retired in 1993, playing in both the first and second levels, with AS Cannes, Paris Saint-Germain FC, FC Sochaux-Montbéliard and OGC Nice.

International career
He earned 70 caps and scored 25 goals for the Yugoslavia national team, making his debut on 1 April 1979 in a 3–0 win against Cyprus for the UEFA Euro 1980 qualifiers, and was included in the squads for the 1982 and 1990 FIFA World Cups while also playing Olympic football in 1980. His final international was a November 1990 European Championship qualification win away against Denmark.

Managerial career
In 2008, Vujović (as had his brother the previous year) began a coaching career, starting as an assistant manager at his first club, Hajduk. He began his third stint in July 2016, when he joined Marijan Pušnik's staff but he left the club in December 2016 after Pušnik was sacked.

References

External links
 

1958 births
Living people
Footballers from Sarajevo
Croats of Bosnia and Herzegovina
Bosnia and Herzegovina twins
Croatian twins
Twin sportspeople
Association football forwards
Yugoslav footballers
Yugoslavia international footballers
Competitors at the 1979 Mediterranean Games
Mediterranean Games gold medalists for Yugoslavia
Mediterranean Games medalists in football
Olympic footballers of Yugoslavia
Footballers at the 1980 Summer Olympics
1982 FIFA World Cup players
UEFA Euro 1984 players
1990 FIFA World Cup players
Bosnia and Herzegovina footballers
Croatian footballers
HNK Hajduk Split players
FC Girondins de Bordeaux players
AS Cannes players
Paris Saint-Germain F.C. players
FC Sochaux-Montbéliard players
OGC Nice players
Yugoslav First League players
Ligue 1 players
Ligue 2 players
Yugoslav expatriate footballers
Bosnia and Herzegovina expatriate footballers
Expatriate footballers in France
Yugoslav expatriate sportspeople in France
Bosnia and Herzegovina expatriate sportspeople in France
HNK Hajduk Split non-playing staff